Mahar Ijaz Ahmad Achlana is a Pakistani politician  who is a Member of the Provincial Assembly of the Punjab, from 2002 to May 2013 and from August 2018 to January 2023.

Early life and education
He was born on 15 January 1966 in Layyah District.

He has graduated in Law.

Political career
He was elected to the Provincial Assembly of the Punjab as a candidate of Pakistan Muslim League (N) (PML-N) from Constituency PP-265 (Layyah-IV) in 2002 Pakistani general election.

He was re-elected to the Provincial Assembly of the Punjab as a candidate of PML-N from Constituency PP-265 (Layyah-IV) in 2008 Pakistani general election.

He was elected to the Provincial Assembly of the Punjab as a candidate of PML-N from Constituency PP-265 (Layyah-IV) in 2013 Pakistani general election.

In December 2013, he was appointed as Parliamentary Secretary for home.

In November 2016, he was inducted into the provincial Punjab cabinet of Chief Minister Shehbaz Sharif and was made Provincial Minister of Punjab for Disaster Management.

He was re-elected to Provincial Assembly of the Punjab as a candidate of PML-N from Constituency PP-283 (Layyah-IV) in 2018 Pakistani general election.

References

Living people
Punjab MPAs 2013–2018
1966 births
Pakistan Muslim League (N) MPAs (Punjab)
Punjab MPAs 2002–2007
Punjab MPAs 2008–2013
People from Layyah District
Punjab MPAs 2018–2023